Streptomyces asiaticus is a bacterium species from the genus Streptomyces which has been isolated from the ectorhizosphere from the plant Falcataria moluccana (= Paraserianthes falcataria) in Java on the island Yogyakarta in Indonesia.

See also 
 List of Streptomyces species

References

Further reading

External links
Type strain of Streptomyces asiaticus at BacDive -  the Bacterial Diversity Metadatabase

asiaticus
Bacteria described in 2001